North Lyon County USD 251 is a public unified school district headquartered in Americus, Kansas, United States.  The district includes the communities of Americus, Admire, Allen, Bushong, Miller, Reading, and nearby rural areas.

History
North Lyon County is the unified school district for the Northern part of Lyon County. North Lyon County USD 251 formed in 1958, when Admire, Allen, Bushong, and Miller consolidated. Those schools were turned into elementary schools. In 1973, Americus High School joined the district, moving the high school to Northern Heights, and changing its name to North Lyon County Junior High School. In 1981, Reading High School joined USD 251, changing the school's name to Reading Elementary School.

Current schools
The school district operates the following schools:
 Northern Heights High School
 North Lyon County Elementary School

Former Schools
 Admire Elementary/Junior High School
 Americus Elementary School 
 Reading Elementary

See also
 List of high schools in Kansas
 List of unified school districts in Kansas
 Kansas State Department of Education
 Kansas State High School Activities Association

References

External links
 

School districts in Kansas
Public high schools in Kansas
Public middle schools in Kansas
Public elementary schools in Kansas
Education in Lyon County, Kansas
School districts established in 1958
1958 establishments in Kansas